

Academics 
 Luthfi Assyaukanie
 Azyumardi Azra
 Arief Budiman, sociologist, brother of Soe Hok Gie, professor at the University of Melbourne, formerly at Satya Wacana Christian University
 Winai Dahlan, founder Director of the Halal Science Center Chulalongkorn University
 Firmanzah
 Sunaryati Hartono
 Ong Hok Ham, one of the leading experts on Indonesian history during the 19th century Dutch colonial rule
 Samaun Samadikun
 Pantur Silaban
 Yohanes Surya
 Leo Suryadinata
 Jawahir Thontowi
 Djoehana Wiradikarta

Arts and entertainment

Arts 
 Basuki Abdullah
 Affandi
 Kartika Affandi-Koberl
 Marina Joesoef, painter and photographer
 Raden Saleh
 Asep Sunandar Sunarya
 Tio Tjay

Dance
Gusmiati Suid (1942–2001), choreographer

Film 
 Oka Antara, actor
 Ateng, actor, comedian
 Laudya Chintya Bella, actress
 Meriam Bellina, actress
 Titi Rajo Bintang, actress, drummer
 Garin Nugroho, film director
 Rianti Cartwright, actress, presenter
 Pierre Coffin (half Indonesian), French co-director of Despicable Me
 Nia Dinata, film director
 Julie Estelle, actress
 Ian Gouw, Chinese-Indonesian descent Hong Kong actor and model
 Tania Gunadi, actress
 Christine Hakim, actress
 Usmar Ismail, film director
 Famke Janssen (quarter-Indonesian)
 Titi Kamal, actress
 Rano Karno, actor, politician
 Sophia Latjuba (half-Indonesian), actress
 Bunga Citra Lestari, actress, singer
 Tuti Indra Malaon, actress
 Camelia Malik, actress
 Deddy Mizwar, actor and film director
 Prisia Nasution, actress
 Jajang C. Noer, actress
 Soekarno M. Noer, actor
 Tio Pakusadewo, actor
 Barry Prima, actor
 Reza Rahadian, actor
 Chelsea Islan, actress
 Nora Samosir (half-Indonesian), Singaporean actress
 Asrul Sani, writer, poet and screenwriter
 Nadia Saphira, actress, model, lawyer
 Nicholas Saputra, actor
 Joko Anwar, film director
 Dian Sastrowardoyo, actress
 Acha Septriasa, actress
 Abimana Aryasatya, actor and film producer
 Sjumandjaja, director, screenwriter, and actor
 Bing Slamet, actor
 Julyana Soelistyo, American stage and film actress
 Sophan Sophiaan, actor
 Tora Sudiro, actor
 Suzzanna, actress
 Joe Taslim, actor
 Kristian Andreas Sinaga. actor
 Revalina Sayuthi Temat, actress
 Imelda Therinne, actress
 Wim Umboh, film director
 Iko Uwais, actor
 Nirina Zubir, actress, presenter
 Lo Lieh, Indonesian-born Hong Kong actor
 Mimi Mariani, actress

Music 
 Daniel Adams-Ray, Swedish rapper, singer of Indonesian descent
 Ebiet G. Ade, country singer
 Wisnu Witono Adhi, Norwegian Idol finalist
 Afgan, pop singer
 Vidi Aldiano, singer
 Joey Alexander, pianist
 Ahmad Albar, rock singer
 Haddad Alwi, nasheed singer
 Amara, singer-songwriter
 Raisa Andriana, singer
 Anggun
 Ian Antono, guitarist, songwriter
 Anan Anwar (half-Indonesian)
 Joni Anwar (half-Indonesian)
 Nicky Astria, singer
 Nike Ardilla, singer
 Nowela Elizabeth Auparay, winner of the seventh season of Indonesian Idol, singer
 Carmit Bachar (quarter-Indonesian), singer
 Michelle Branch (quarter-Indonesian), singer, musician
 Adia Chan, Chinese-Indonesian Hong Kong actress, singer, model, and spokesperson
 Rich Brian, Rapper
 Chrisye
 Inul Daratista, dangdut singer
 Dewiq, singer-songwriter
 Ahmad Dhani, rock musician
 Angger Dimas, DJ
 Hetty Koes Endang
 Maia Estianty
 Iwan Fals, singer
 Glenn Fredly, pop R&B singer-songwriter
 Giring Ganesha
 Melly Goeslaw, singer-songwriter
 Erwin Gutawa
 Gita Gutawa, singer-songwriter, actress
 Eduardus Halim, American pianist of Chinese-Indonesian descent
 Berlian Hutauruk
 Rhoma Irama, dangdut singer-songwriter
 Nazril Irham, singer, vocalist of Noah
 Audy Item
 Mulan Jameela, singer
 Januarisman, winner of the fifth season of Indonesian Idol, rock singer
 Iwa K, rapper
 Lala Karmela
 Tonny Koeswoyo
 Krisdayanti, singer
 Lee Kum-Sing, classical pianist
 Indra Lesmana, jazz pianist
 Reza Ningtyas Lindh, Swedish Idol finalist
 Fatin Shidqia Lubis, winner of the first season of X Factor Indonesia
 A. T. Mahmud
 Dougy Mandagi, vocals and guitar with The Temper Trap
 Gesang Martohartono, Keroncong composer, songwriter of the famous song "Bengawan Solo"
 Jessica Mauboy, runner-up of the fourth season of Australian Idol, Australian r&b singer of Indonesian descent
 Once Mekel
 Agnez Mo, R&B singer and dancer
 Frans Mohede, singer
 Mike Mohede, winner of the second season of Indonesian Idol, soul and gospel singer
 Addie MS
 Mytha Mulyarto, winner of the first season of Mamamia Show, jazz singer
 Fariz Rustam Munaf
 Sherina Munaf, actress, singer-songwriter
 Taco Ockerse, singer
 Vina Panduwinata
 Eric Papilaya, Eurovision Song Contest 2007 representative of Austria
 Dewi Persik
 Indah Dewi Pertiwi
 Broery Pesulima, singer-songwriter
 Titiek Puspa, singer-songwriter, actress
 Bebi Romeo, singer-songwriter
 Rossa, singer
 Darian Sahanaja, singer-songwriter
 Ruth Sahanaya, singer
 Daniel Sahuleka (half-Indonesian), musician and singer
 Isyana Sarasvati
 Citra Scholastika
 Elfa Secioria
 Shae, singer
 Yuni Shara, singer
 Putri Ayu Silaen, soprano singer
 Wibi Soerjadi, pianist
 Sandhy Sondoro, singer
 Raden Ajeng Srimulat, Keroncong singer and comedian
 Dira Sugandi, jazz singer
 Elvy Sukaesih
 Mbah Surip, reggae singer
 Aubrey Suwito, Malaysian pianist, keyboardist, songwriter of Indonesian descent
 Terry, singer
 Ayu Tingting, dangdut singer
 Goh Soon Tioe (quarter-Indonesian), key player in the development of classical music for post-war Singapore
 Titi DJ, singer
 Joy Tobing, winner of the first season of Indonesian Idol, singer
 Trie Utami, jazz singer
 Alex Van Halen (quarter-Indonesian), member of the rock group Van Halen
 Eddie Van Halen (quarter-Indonesian), member of the rock group Van Halen
 Armand Van Helden (quarter Indonesian), DJ
 Hendry Wijaya, pianist
 Kuei Pin Yeo, pianist
 Wayan Yudane, gangsa player and an exponent of Balinese music in New Zealand
 Catalina Yue (quarter-Indonesian), Canadian-American actress, singer
 Yura, singer
 Rainych

Television 
 Raffi Ahmad, actor, presenter, TV personality, comedian
 Rachel Amanda, actress
 Sutan Amrull, American-Indonesian TV personality, makeup artist, drag performer
 Lulu Antariksa (half-Indonesian), American actress, singer
 Tukul Arwana, host of talk show Bukan Empat Mata
 Indy Barends, presenter
 Basuki, member of traditional comedy group Srimulat
 Indra Birowo, actor, comedian
 Billy Chong, actor
 Sandra Dewi, actress, TV personality
 Dorce Gamalama, trans woman pop singer, actress, presenter, and comedian
 Mark-Paul Gosselaar (quarter-Indonesian), American actor
 Tania Gunadi, American actress of Chinese-Indonesian descent
 Donna Harun (half-Indonesian), actress, presenter, TV personality
 Dude Harlino, actor
 Jojon, comedian
 Kristin Kreuk (half-Indonesian), Canadian actress
 Daniel Mananta, presenter
 Marshanda, actress, singer
 Amelia Natasha, presenter
 Soimah Pancawati, traditional singer and performer, comedian
 Julia Perez, comedian, actress, singer
 Nia Ramadhani, actress, socialite
 Olla Ramlan, actress, presenter, socialite, TV personality
 Feni Rose, presenter
 Evan Sanders, actor, presenter
 Alyssa Soebandono, actress
 Benyamin Sueb, actor, comedian, film director and singer
 Sule, comedian
 Alin Sumarwata (half-Indonesian), Australian actress
 Shireen Sungkar, actress
 Olga Syahputra, comedian
 Syahrini, TV personality, singer, socialite
 Aliando Syarief, actor
 Mikha Tambayong, actress, model
 Chelsea Olivia Wijaya (half-Indonesian), actress
 Nikita Willy, actress
 Rini Wulandari, winner of the fourth season of Indonesian Idol, singer
 Tantowi Yahya, presenter

Business and economics

Business people 
 Aburizal Bakrie
 Ciputra
 Erick Thohir
 Setiawan Djody
 Batara Eto
 Rachman Halim
 Michael Bambang Hartono
 Robert Budi Hartono
 Bob Hasan
 Dahlan Iskan
 Abdul Latief
 Prajogo Pangestu
 Probosutedjo
 Raam Punjabi
 James Riady
 Mochtar Riady
 Bob Sadino
 Sudono Salim (Liem Sioe Liong)
 Anthoni Salim (Liem Hong Sien)
 Michael Joseph Sampoerna
 Putera Sampoerna
 Jaka Singgih
 Martua Sitorus
 William Soeryadjaya
 Tommy Suharto
 Jaya Suprana
 Djoko Susanto
 Sehat Sutardja
 Tan Khoen Swie
 Dato Sri Tahir
 Chairul Tanjung
 Hary Tanoesoedibjo
 Sukanto Tanoto
 Erick Thohir
 Sandiaga Salahudin Uno
 Jusuf Wanandi (Liem Bian Kie)
 Eka Tjipta Widjaja
 Fuganto Widjaja
 Tomy Winata
 Surya Wonowidjojo
 Susilo Wonowidjojo

Business executives 
 Karen Agustiawan
 Betti Alisjahbana
 Rinaldi Firmansyah
 Ibnu Sutowo

Economists 
 Armida Alisjahbana, State Minister for National Development Planning (2009-2014)
 J. Soedradjad Djiwandono, Governor of Bank of Indonesia (1993-1998)
 Sumitro Djojohadikusumo, Minister of Industry and Trade (1950-1951) and Minister of Finance (1952-1953)
 Kwik Kian Gie, Coordinating Minister for Economics and Finance (1999-2000)
 Sri Mulyani Indrawati, Managing Director of the World Bank Group
 Agus Martowardojo, Minister of Finance (2010-2013) and Governor of Bank of Indonesia (2013)
 Darmin Nasution, Governor of Bank of Indonesia (2010-2013)
 Widjojo Nitisastro, Coordinating Minister for Economics, Finance and Industry (1973-1983)
 Mari Pangestu, Minister of Trade (2004-2011)
 Radius Prawiro, Governor of Bank of Indonesia (1966-1968), Minister of Trade (1973-1983), Minister of Finance (1983-1988)
 Rizal Ramli, Coordinating Minister for Economics (2000-2001) and Minister of Finance (2001)
 Syahril Sabirin, Governor of Bank Indonesia (1999-2003)
 Emil Salim
 Hadi Soesastro, economist and political scientist (international relations)
 Syahrir, Economic Adviser in the Council of Presidential Advisers of Susilo Bambang Yudhoyono (2007-2008)
 Gita Wirjawan, Minister of Trade (2011-2014) and the founder of Ancora Group and Ancora Foundation

Fashion

Fashion designers 
 Anne Avantie
 Sebastian Gunawan
 Didit Hediprasetyo
 Oscar Lawalata
 Obin
 Tex Saverio
 Auguste Soesastro
 Iwan Tirta
 Biyan Wanaatmadja

Fashion models 
 Mesty Ariotedjo, medical doctor, harpist, model and socialite
 Ayu Gani, winner of Asia's Next Top Model (cycle 3)
 Nadya Hutagalung (half-Indonesian), model
 Luna Maya, model, actress
 Jodi Ann Paterson (half-Indonesian), Playboy Playmate
 Manohara Odelia Pinot
 Mariana Renata (half-Indonesian), model

Pageant winners

Puteri Indonesia (Miss Indonesia Universe) 
 Nadine Ames (2011) 
 Frederika Alexis Cull (2019) 
 Nadine Chandrawinata (2005)
 Artika Sari Devi (2004)
 Elvira Devinamira (2014)
 Whulandary Herman (2013)
 Agni Kuswardono (2006)
 Maria Selena Nurcahya (2009)
 Putri Raemawasti (2007)
 Qory Sandioriva (2010)
 Zivanna Letisha Siregar (2008)
 Kezia Warouw (2016)

Miss Indonesia (Miss Indonesia World) 
 Sandra Angelia (2008)
 Kristania Virginia Besouw (2006)
 Imelda Fransisca (2005)
 Karenina Sunny Halim (2009)
 Maria Harfanti (2015)
 Vania Larissa (2013)
 Asyifa Latief (2010)
 Ines Putri (2012)
 Kamidia Radisti (2007)
 Maria Asteria Sastrayu Rahajeng (2014)
 Astrid Yunadi (2011)

Miss Indonesia Earth 
 Annisa Ananda Nusyirwan (2014)
 Nita Sofiani (2013)

Miss Indonesia International 
 Kevin Lilliana Miss International 2017
 Jolene Marie Cholock-Rotinsulu (2019)
 Chintya Fabyola (2015)
 Reisa Kartikasari (2011)
 Marisa Sartika Maladewi (2013)
 Liza Elly Purnamasari (2012)
 Elfin Rappa (2014)

Journalism and writing 

 Djamaluddin Adinegoro, journalist in the colonial era
 Sutan Takdir Alisjahbana
 Svida Alisjahbana, President and CEO of Femina Magazine
 Desi Anwar
 Rosihan Anwar, founder of Siasat magazine and Pedoman newspaper
 Thio Tjin Boen, writer of Malay-language fiction and a journalist
 Lauw Giok Lan,  journalist and one of the founders of Sin Po newspaper 
 Ernest Douwes Dekker
 Nirwan Dewanto, poet, cultural critic
 Ahmadun Yosi Herfanda, arts editor
 Andrea Hirata, novelist
 Ani Idrus, founder of Waspada daily newspaper
 Kho Ping Hoo, author of Chinese ethnicity
 Kwee Tek Hoay, Chinese-Indonesian Malay-language writer of novels and drama, journalist
 Dewi Lestari
 Pramoedya Ananta Toer
 Putra Nababan
 Budi Putra, technology journalist
 Rahadyan Sastrowardoyo, editor and photographer
 Atika Shubert

 Najwa Shihab

Law 
 Basrief Arief
 Jimly Asshiddiqie
 Albertina Ho
 Hotman Paris Hutapea
 Tjung Tin Jan
 Todung Mulya Lubis
 Mohammad Mahfud
 Wirjono Prodjodikoro
 Abraham Samad
 Bismar Siregar
 Hendarman Supandji
 Hamdan Zoelva
 Artidjo Alkostar

Crime
 Reynhard Sinaga, serial rapist and most prolific rapist in English legal history
 Sundarti Supriyanto, domestic maid and victim of maid abuse who killed her abusive employer Angie Ng in Singapore, and also Ng's daughter Crystal Poh
Daryati, Indonesian maid sentenced to life imprisonment in Singapore for murdering her employer Seow Kim Choo

National Heroes 

 Abdul Halim
 Abdul Haris Nasution
 Adam Malik
 Agus Salim
 Ahmad Yani
 Bagindo Azizchan
 Bung Tomo
 Cut Nyak Dhien
 Fatmawati
 Gatot Soebroto
 Halim Perdanakusuma
 Hamengkubuwono I
 Hamengkubuwono IX
 Hasyim Asy'ari
 I Gusti Ngurah Rai
 John Lie Tjeng Tjoan
 Kartini
 Katamso Darmokusumo
 Mohammad Hatta
 Mohammad Husni Thamrin
 Mohammad Natsir
 Mohammad Yamin
 Sam Ratulangi
 Siti Hartinah
 Soekarno
 Sutan Sjahrir
 Wahid Hasyim
 Wahidin Soedirohoesodo

Politicians and administrators

Presidents 

 Soekarno, 1st President of Indonesia (1945-1967)
 Assaat, Provisional President of Republic of Indonesia (1949-1950)
 Soeharto, 2nd President of Indonesia (1967-1998)
 BJ Habibie, 3rd President of Indonesia (1998-1999)
 Abdurrahman Wahid, 4th President of Indonesia (1999-2001)
 Megawati Soekarnoputri, 5th President of Indonesia (2001-2004)
 Susilo Bambang Yudhoyono, 6th President of Indonesia (2004-2014)
 Joko Widodo, 7th President of Indonesia (since 2014)

Spouses of Presidents 
 Fatmawati, wife of Soekarno (1945-1967)
 Siti Hartinah, wife of Soeharto (1967-1998)
 Hasri Ainun Habibie, wife of BJ Habibie (1998-1999)
 Sinta Nuriyah, wife of Abdurrahman Wahid (1999-2001)
 Taufiq Kiemas, husband of Megawati Soekarnoputri (2001-2004)
 Kristiani Herrawati, wife of Susilo Bambang Yudhoyono (2004-2014)
 Iriana Joko Widodo, wife of Joko Widodo (since 2014)

Vice-Presidents 

 Boediono, 11th Vice-President of Indonesia (2009-2014)
 Mohammad Hatta, 1st Vice-President of Indonesia (1945-1956)
 Hamzah Haz, 9th Vice-President of Indonesia (2001-2004)
 Jusuf Kalla, 10th and 12th Vice-President of Indonesia (2004-2009 & 2014-2019)
 Adam Malik, 3rd Vice-President of Indonesia (1978-1983)
 Sudharmono, 5th Vice-President of Indonesia (1988-1993)
 Try Sutrisno, 6th Vice-President of Indonesia (1993-1998)
 Umar Wirahadikusumah, 4th Vice-President of Indonesia (1983-1988)

Prime Ministers 

 Abdul Halim, 4th Prime Minister of Indonesia (1950)
 Burhanuddin Harahap, 9th Prime Minister of Indonesia (1955-1956)
 Djuanda Kartawidjaja, 10th Prime Minister of Indonesia (1957-1959)
 Muhammad Natsir, 5th Prime Minister of Indonesia (1950-1951)
 Ali Sastroamidjojo, 8th Prime Minister of Indonesia (1953-1955 & 1956-1957)
 Sutan Sjahrir, 1st Prime Minister of Indonesia (1945-1947)
 Amir Sjarifuddin, 2nd Prime Minister of Indonesia (1947-1948)
 Wilopo, 7th Prime Minister of Indonesia (1952-1953)
 Soekiman Wirjosandjojo, 6th Prime Minister of Indonesia (1951-1952)

Government Ministers 
 Ruslan Abdulgani, Minister of Foreign Affairs (1956-1957) & Minister of Information (1963-1964)
 Azwar Abubakar, Minister of Administrative Reform (2011-2014)
 Amirmachmud, Minister of Home Affairs of the Republic of Indonesia (1969-1983)
 Anton Apriantono, Minister of Agriculture (2004-2009)
 Cosmas Batubara, State Minister of Public Housing (1978-1988) & Minister of Labor (1988-1993)
 Bachtiar Chamsyah, Minister of Social (2001-2009)
 Adhyaksa Dault, Minister Youth and Sports (2004-2009)
 Jusman Syafii Djamal, Minister of Transportation (2007-2009)
 Agum Gumelar, Minister of Transportation (1999-2001 & 2001-2004), Minister of Defense (2001) & Coordinating Minister for Politic, Social and Security (2001)
 Soedarsono Hadisapoetro, Minister of Agriculture (1978-1983)
 Mohamad Suleman Hidayat, Minister of Industry (2009-2014)
 Fahmi Idris, Minister of Labour and Transmigration (1998-1999 & 2004-2005) & Minister of Industry (2005-2009)
 Malam Sambat Kaban, Minister of Forestry (2004-2009)
 Kusmayanto Kadiman, Minister of Research and Technology (2004-2009)
 Ginandjar Kartasasmita, Minister of Energy And Mineral Resources (1988-1993)& Coordinating Minister for Economics, Finance and Industry (1998 & 1998-1999)
 Agung Laksono, Minister Youth and Sports (2012-2013), Minister of Religious Affairs (2014) & Coordinating Minister for People's Welfare (2009-2014)
 Yusril Ihza Mahendra, Minister of Justice and Human Rights (1999-2001), Minister of Law (2001-2004) and Minister of State Secretary (2004-2007)
 Nabiel Makarim, State Minister of Environment (2001-2004)
 Susi Pudjiastuti, Minister of Maritime Affairs and Fisheries (since 2014)
 Hatta Rajasa, State Minister of Research and Technology (2001-2004), Minister of Transportation (2004-2007), Minister of State Secretary (2007-2009), Coordinating Minister for Economics (2009-2014)
 Chaerul Saleh, Minister of Energy and Mineral Resources (1959-1964) & Minister of Industry (1960-1964)
 Juwono Sudarsono, State Minister of Environment (1998), Minister of National Education (1998-1999) & Minister of Defence (1999-2000 & 2004-2009)
 Suharna Surapranata, Minister of Research and Technology of Indonesia (2009-2011)
 Djoko Suyanto, Coordinating Minister for Politic, Law and Security (2009-2014)
 Tarmizi Taher, Minister of Religious Affairs (1993-1998)
 Akbar Tanjung, Minister of Youth and Sports (1988-1993), State Minister for Public Housing (1993-1998) & Minister of State Secretary (1998-1999)
 Jero Wacik, Minister of Culture and Tourism (2004-2011) & Minister of Energy and Mineral Resources (2011-2014)
 Wiranto, Minister of Defense and Security (1998-1999) & Coordinating Minister for Politic, Law and Security (1999-2000, 2016-)
 Rachmat Witoelar, State Minister of Environment (2004-2009)
 Arief Yahya, Minister of Tourism (since 2014)
 Muhammad Yamin, Minister of Justice (1951-1952), Minister of Education (1953-1955) & Minister of Information (1962)

Diplomats 
 Achmad Soebardjo, Minister of Foreign Affairs of Indonesia (1945 - 1945 & 1951-1952)
 Adam Malik, Minister of Foreign Affairs of Indonesia (1966-1978)
 Ali Alatas, Minister of Foreign Affairs of Indonesia (1988-1999)
 Nicholas Tandi Dammen, Indonesian Ambassador to the South Korea (since 2009)
 Hartono Rekso Dharsono, 1st Secretary General of the ASEAN (1976-1978)
 Dino Patti Djalal, Indonesian Ambassador to the United States (2010-2013)
 Marty Natalegawa, Minister of Foreign Affairs (2009-2014)
 Agus Salim, Minister of Foreign Affairs of Indonesia (1947-1949)
 Sunario Sastrowardoyo, Minister of Foreign Affairs of Indonesia (1957-1959)
 Alwi Shihab, Minister of Foreign Affairs of Indonesia (1999-2001)
 Hassan Wirajuda, Minister of Foreign Affairs of Indonesia (2001-2009)
 Retno Marsudi, Minister of Foreign Affairs of Indonesia (since 2014)

Province Governors 
 Mustafa Abubakar, Governor of Aceh (2004-2007)
 Eko Maulana Ali, Governor of Bangka Belitung (2007-2013)
 Azwar Anas, Governor of West Sumatra (1977-1987)
 Dewa Made Beratha, Governor of Bali (1998-2008)
 Daud Beureu'eh, Governor of Aceh (1945-1953)
 Ratu Atut Chosiyah, Governor of Banten (2007-2014)
 Teuku Muhammad Hasan, Governor of Sumatra (1945-1949)
 Ahmad Heryawan, Governor of West Java (since 2009)
 Cornelis M.H., Governor of West Kalimantan (since 2008)
 Ben Mboi, Governor of East Nusa Tenggara (1978-1988)
 Rizal Nurdin, Governor of North Sumatra (1998-2005)
 Basuki Tjahaja Purnama, Governor of Jakarta (2014-2017)
 Djarot Saiful Hidayat Governor of Jakarta (2017)
 Ali Sadikin, Governor of Jakarta (1966-1977)
 José Abílio Osório Soares, Governor of East Timor (1992-1999)
 Sutiyoso, Governor of Jakarta (1997-2007)
 Hamengkubuwana IX, Governor of Yogyakarta (1945-1988)
 Irwandi Yusuf, Governor of Aceh (2007-2012)
 Anies Rasyid Baswedan, Governor of Jakarta (since 2017)
 Hamengkubuwana X, Governor of Yogyakarta (since 1998)
 Ganjar Pranowo, Governor of Central Java (since 2013)
 Joko Widodo, Governor of Jakarta (2012-2014)
 Hasan Basri Durin Governor of West Sumatra (1987-1997)
 Fauzi Bowo, Governor of Jakarta (2007-2012)
 Gamawan Fauzi, Governor of West Sumatra (2005-2009)
 Rano Karno, Governor of Banten (2014-2017)
 Irwan Prayitno, Governor of West Sumatra (since 2016)
 Paku Alam VIII, Governor of Yogyakarta (1988-1998)
 Soekarwo, Governor of East Java (since 2014)
 Rusli Habibie, Governor of Gorontalo (since 2017)
 Olly Dondokambey, Governor of North Sulawesi (since 2016)
 Awang Faroek Ishak, Governor of East Kalimantan (since 2013)
 Muhammad Zainul Majdi, Governor of West Nusa Tenggara (since 2008)
 Sam Ratulangi, Governor of Sulawesi (1945-1949)
 El Tari, Governor of East Nusa Tenggara (1966-1978)
 Sutan Mohammad Amin Nasution, Governor of North Sumatra (1948), (1953-1956), Governor of Riau (1958-1960)
 Wan Abubakar, Governor of Riau (2008)
 Gatot Pujo Nugroho, Governor of North Sumatra (2011-2015)

Mayors 
 Ridwan Kamil, Mayor of Bandung (since 2013)
 Tri Rismaharini, Mayor of Surabaya (since 2010)
 Mohammad Ramdhan Pomanto, Mayor of Makassar (since 2014)
 Dada Rosada, Mayor of Bandung (2003-2013)
 F. X. Hadi Rudyatmo, Mayor of Surakarta (since 2012)
 Ateng Wahyudi, Mayor of Bandung (1983-1993)
 Joko Widodo, Mayor of Surakarta (2005-2012)
 Mahyeldi Ansharullah, Mayor of Padang (since 2014)
 Hasan Basri Durin, Mayor of Padang (1971-1983)

Members of People's Representative Council 
 Alvin Lie
 Soedardjat Nataatmadja
 Budiman Sudjatmiko
 Astrid Susanto

Politicians 
 Dipa Nusantara Aidit, senior leader of Communist Party of Indonesia (PKI)
 Biem Benyamin
 Manuel Carrascalão, former Indonesian politician
 Omar Dhani, commander of the Indonesian Air Force (1962-1965)
 H. S. Dillon, Indonesian Indian who has occupied a variety of positions in Indonesian political life, including assistant to the Minister of Agriculture, and Commissioner of the National Commission on Human Rights (of which he is still a member)
 Prabowo Subianto Djojohadikusumo, chairman of Gerindra political party, 2014 Indonesia's presidential candidate
 Eurico Guterres, pro-Indonesian or anti-independence militia recruited by the Indonesian military
 Loa Sek Hie, colonial politician, community leader, patrician, landlord and founder of Pao An Tui
 Hok Hoei Kan, prominent public figure, statesman, patrician and landowner of Peranakan Chinese descent
 Muhammad Taufiq Kiemas, 13th Speaker of People's Consultative Assembly (2009-2013), 5th First Gentleman of Indonesia (2001-2004)
 Musso, leader of the Indonesian Communist Party (PKI) in the 1920s and again during the Madiun rebellion of 1948
 Amien Rais, 1st Chairman of Partai Amanat Nasional (1998-2005)& Speaker of People's Consultative Assembly (1999-2004)
 Frans Tutuhatunewa, second president in exile of the Republic of the South Moluccas
 Hidayat Nur Wahid, 12th Speaker of Indonesia People's Consultative Assembly (2004-2009)
 Dede Yusuf, former Vice Governor of West Java, actor, model
 Sidarto Danusubroto, 14th Speaker of Indonesia People's Consultative Assembly (2013-2014)

Nobility 
 Ahmad Jayadiningrat of Banten
 Hasanuddin of Gowa
 Andi Abdullah Bau Massepe of Gowa
 Sultan Tangkal Alam Bagagar of Pagaruyung
 Kyai Ronggo Ngabehi Soero Pernollo, Chinese-Javanese police chief, bureaucrat and founder of the Muslim branch of the Han family of Lasem
 Prince Diponegoro of Yogyakarta
 Paku Alam VIII of Yogyakarta
 Hamengkubuwana IX of Yogyakarta, 2nd Vice-President of Indonesia (1973-1978)
 Hamengkubuwana X of Yogyakarta, Governor of Yogyakarta (since 1998)
 Queen Hemas of Yogyakarta
 Princess Hayu of Yogyakarta
 Princess Pembayun of Yogyakarta

Activists 
 Soe Hok Gie
 Ita Martadinata Haryono
 Munir
 Poncke Princen
 Thung Sin Nio
 Yap Thiam Hien

Others 
 Madame Wellington Koo (born Oei Hui-lan), First Lady of China, socialite and fashion icon, wife of the Chinese statesman Wellington Koo and daughter of Majoor Oei Tiong Ham 
 Lolo Soetoro, step-father of Barack Obama
 Maya Soetoro-Ng, half-sister of Barack Obama
 Yenny Wahid, daughter of former president Abdurrahman Wahid

Religious

Islam 
 Abdul Karim Amrullah
 Abdurrahman Wahid
 Amien Rais
 Mustofa Bisri
 Ahmad Dede
 Hamka
 Hasyim Asyari
 Hasyim Muzadi
 Idham Chalid
 Jefri Al Buchori
 Jimly Asshiddiqie
 Ma'ruf Amin
 Mohammad Natsir
 Quraish Shihab
 Din Syamsuddin
 Tutty Alawiyah
 Tuanku Imam Bonjol
 Tuanku Tambusai
 Maria Ulfah
 Fakih Usman
 Wahid Hasyim

Buddhism 
 Ashin Jinarakkhita
 Parwati Soepangat
 Soemantri Mohammad Saleh

Hinduism 
 Gedong Bagus Oka
 Ketut Wiana
 Putu Sukreta Suranta

Protestantism 
 Ibrahim Tunggul Wulung
 Kyai Sadrach

Roman Catholic 
 Albertus Soegijapranata
 Justinus Darmojuwono
 Julius Darmaatmadja
 Ignatius Suharyo Hardjoatmodjo
 Benyamin Yosef Bria
 Gabriel Manek

Sport

Aviation 
 Khouw Khe Hien, pioneering Indonesian aviator 
 Khouw Keng Nio, first Indonesian and Chinese woman aviator (qualified in March 1936)

Archery 
 Diananda Choirunisa
 Ika Yuliana Rochmawati
 Hendra Purnama
 Kusuma Wardhani
 Lilies Handayani
 Muhammad Hanif Wijaya
 Nurfitriyana Saiman
 Riau Ega Agatha
 Rina Dewi Puspitasari

Athletics 
 Agus Prayogo
 Carolina Rieuwpassa
 Dedeh Erawati
 Desy Margawati
 Dolly Zegerius
 Edward Nabunone
 Fadlin
 Fernando Lumain
 Gurnam Singh
 Irene Truitje Joseph
 Lalu Muhammad Zohri
 Maria Natalia Londa
 Mohammad Sarengat
 Rio Maholtra
 Sapwaturrahman
 Sudirman Hadi
 Supriyati Sutono
 Suryo Agung Wibowo
 Triyaningsih
 Yaspi Boby

Auto racing 
 Nyck de Vries, (quarter-Indonesian), Formula One racing driver
 Zahir Ali, Formula driver
 Philo Paz Armand, Formula driver
 Sean Gelael, Formula driver
 Rio Haryanto, Formula driver
 Satrio Hermanto, Formula driver
 Ananda Mikola, Formula driver
 Doni Tata Pradita
 Moreno Soeprapto, Formula driver
 Rafid Topan Sucipto
 Dimas Ekky Pratama
 Galang Hendra Pratama

Badminton 

 Ade Chandra
 Ade Yusuf Santoso
 Adriyanti Firdasari
 Afiat Yuris Wirawan
 Alamsyah Yunus
 Alan Budikusuma
 Alfian Eko Prasetya
 Alvent Yulianto
 Ana Rovita
 Andre Kurniawan Tedjono
 Andika Ramadiansyah
 Andrei Adistia
 Angelica Wiratama
 Angga Pratama
 Anggia Shitta Awanda
 Anggun Nugroho
 Anneke Feinya Agustin
 Annisa Saufika
 Anthony Sinisuka Ginting
 Antonius Ariantho
 Aprilia Yuswandari
 Apriyani Rahayu
 Ardy Wiranata
 Aryono Miranat
 Asty Dwi Widyaningrum
 Bambang Suprianto
 Bellaetrix Manuputty
 Berry Angriawan
 Bobby Ertanto
 Bona Septano
 Bunga Fitriani Romadhini 
 Candra Wijaya
 Chico Aura Dwi Wardoyo
 Christian Hadinata
 Debby Susanto
 Denny Kantono
 Della Destiara Haris
 Dian Fitriani
 Dinar Dyah Ayustine
 Dionysius Hayom Rumbaka
 Devi Tika Permatasari
 Deyana Lomban
 Eddy Hartono
 Eddy Kurniawan
 Edi Subaktiar
 Eliza Nathanael
 Ellen Angelina
 Endang Nursugianti
 Eng Hian
 Erma Sulistianingsih
 Fajar Alfian
 Fachryza Abimanyu
 Febby Angguni
 Fernando Kurniawan
 Ferry Sonneville
 Fikri Ihsandi Hadmadi
 Finarsih
 Fitriani
 Firman Abdul Kholik
 Fran Kurniawan
 Fransisca Ratnasari
 Gebby Ristiyani Imawan
 Gloria Emanuelle Widjaja
 Gregoria Mariska Tunjung
 Greysia Polii
 Hadibowo Susanto
 Hafiz Faizal
 Halim Haryanto
 Hanna Ramadini
 Hariamanto Kartono
 Hardianto
 Hariyanto Arbi
 Hastomo Arbi
 Hendra Setiawan
 Hendra Aprida Gunawan 
 Hendrawan
 Hera Desi
 Hermawan Susanto
 Icuk Sugiarto
 Ihsan Maulana Mustofa
 Iie Sumirat
 Imelda Wiguna
 Indra Viki Okvana
 Irfan Fadhilah
 Ivana Lie
 Jauza Fadhila Sugiarto
 Jenna Gozali
 Jo Novita
 Johan Wahjudi
 Joko Suprianto
 Jonatan Christie
 Kenas Adi Haryanto
 Keshya Nurvita Hanadia
 Kevin Sanjaya Sukamuljo
 Komala Dewi
 Krishna Adi Nugraha
 Lidya Djaelawijaya
 Liem Swie King 
 Lili Tampi
 Liliyana Natsir
 Lindaweni Fanetri
 Lingga Lie
 Lita Nurlita
 Lius Pongoh
 Lukhi Apri Nugroho
 Luluk Hadiyanto
 Maretha Dea Giovani
 Maria Febe Kusumastuti
 Maria Kristin Yulianti
 Marcus Fernaldi Gideon
 Markis Kido
 Marleve Mainaky
 Marsheilla Gischa Islami
 Masita Mahmudin
 Meiliana Jauhari
 Meirisa Cindy Sahputri
 Melati Daeva Oktavianti
 Melvira Oklamona
 Mia Audina
 Millicent Wiranto
 Minarni
 Minarti Timur
 Moh Reza Pahlevi Isfahani
 Mohammad Ahsan
 Muhammad Rian Ardianto
 Muhammad Rijal
 Muhammad Ulinnuha
 Muljadi
 Mychelle Crhystine Bandaso
 Nadya Melati
 Natalia Christine Poluakan
 Ni Ketut Mahadewi Istarani
 Nisak Puji Lestari
 Nitya Krishinda Maheswari
 Nova Widianto
 Panji Ahmad Maulana
 Pia Zebadiah Bernadet
 Praveen Jordan
 Rahmadhani Hastiyanti Putri
 Rani Mundiasti
 Rehan Naufal Kusharjanto
 Rendra Wijaya
 Retno Koestijah
 Rexy Mainaky
 Rian Sukmawan
 Richi Puspita Dili
 Ricky Karanda Suwardi
 Ricky Subagja
 Rika Rositawati
 Riky Widianto
 Rinov Rivaldy
 Ririn Amelia
 Rizki Amelia Pradipta
 Ronald Alexander
 Rosiana Tendean
 Rosyita Eka Putri Sari
 Rudy Gunawan
 Rudy Hartono
 Rudy Heryanto
 Ruselli Hartawan
 Rusydina Antardayu Riodingin
 Sarwendah Kusumawardhani
 Selvanus Geh
 Serena Kani
 Shella Devi Aulia
 Shendy Puspa Irawati
 Shesar Hiren Rhustavito
 Sigit Budiarto
 Silvi Antarini
 Simon Santoso
 Siti Fadia Silva Ramadhanti
 Sony Dwi Kuncoro
 Sri Fatmawati
 Suci Rizki Andini
 Susi Susanti
 Tan Joe Hok
 Tania Oktaviani Kusumah
 Taty Sumirah
 Taufik Hidayat
 Tiara Rosalia Nuraidah
 Tjun Tjun
 Tommy Sugiarto
 Tony Gunawan
 Tri Kusharjanto
 Utami Kinard
 Vania Arianti Sukoco
 Variella Aprilsasi Putri Lejarsar
 Verawaty Fajrin
 Vita Marissa
 Wahyu Nayaka
 Weni Anggraini
 Wisnu Yuli Prasetyo
 Yeni Asmarani
 Yohanes Rendy Sugiarto
 Yonathan Suryatama Dasuki
 Yulianti
 Yulfira Barkah
 Zelin Resiana

Basketball 
 Arki Dikania Wisnu

Body Building 
 Ade Rai
 Ridwan Kodiat

Boxing 
 Chris John, WBA featherweight boxing champion
 Daud Yordan
 Ellyas Pical
 Muhammad Rachman
 Nico Thomas

Chess 
 Utut Adianto
 Medina Warda Aulia
 Susanto Megaranto
 Irine Kharisma Sukandar

Gymnastics 
 Rifda Irfanaluthfi

Jet ski 
 Aero Sutan Aswar
 Aqsa Sutan Aswar

Judo 
 Pujawati Utama
 Putu Wiradamungga

Football 

 Elie Aiboy
 Yongki Aribowo
 Samsul Arif
 Ponaryo Astaman
 Irfan Bachdim
 Titus Bonai
 Gunawan Dwi Cahyo
 Syamsul Chaeruddin
 Serginho van Dijk
 Bruce Diporedjo
 Cristian Gonzáles
 Agus Indra Kurniawan
 Kim Kurniawan
 Stefano Lilipaly
 Chris Limahelu
 Ebrahim Enguio Lopez
 Oktovianus Maniani
 Markus Haris Maulana
 Diego Michiels
 Radja Nainggolan (half-Indonesian)
 Bambang Pamungkas
 Rochy Putiray
 Bima Sakti
 Vangelino Sastrodimedjo
 Boaz Solossa
 Ilija Spasojević
 Amadeus Suropati
 Firman Utina
 Andik Vermansyah
 Nol van der Vin
 Patrich Wanggai
 Wahyu Wijiastanto
 Ricky Yacobi
 Kurniawan Dwi Yulianto

Golf 
 Inesh Putri Chandra

Poker 
 John Juanda

Sailing 
 Oka Sulaksana

Swimming 

 Achmad Dimyati
 Aflah Fadlan Prawira
 Glenn Victor Sutanto
 Habib Nasution
 I Gede Siman Sudartawa
 Kristiono Sumono
 Lukman Niode
 Ranomi Kromowidjojo (half-Indonesian), world record holder
 Raina Saumi Grahana
 Ressa Kania Dewi
 Ria Tobing
 Richard Sam Bera
 Ricky Anggawijaya
 Triady Fauzi Sidiq
 Wirmandi Sugriat
 Yessy Yosaputra

Taekwondo 
 Defia Rosmaniar
 Juana Wangsa Putri
 Satriyo Rahadhani

Tennis 

 Aldila Sutjiadi
 Angelique Widjaja
 Atet Wijono
 Ayi Sutarno
 Ayu Fani Damayanti 
 Beatrice Gumulya
 Benny Wijaya
 Björn Phau (half-Indonesian)
 Bonit Wiryawan
 Christopher Rungkat
 Deria Nur Haliza
 Donald Wailan-Walalangi
 Grace Sari Ysidora
 Hary Suharyadi
 Irawati Moerid
 Jessy Rompies
 Jesse Huta Galung (half-Indonesian)
 Jooce Suwarimbo
 Justin Barki
 Lany Kaligis
 Lavinia Tananta
 Lita Liem Sugiarto
 Liza Andriyani
 Lukky Tedjamukti
 Lutfiana-Aris Budiharto
 Maya Rosa
 Mien Suhadi
 Natalia Soetrisno
 Olivia Tjandramulia
 Romana Tedjakusuma
 Sandy Gumulya
 Septi Mende
 Suzanna Wibowo
 Tami Grende
 Vivien Silfany-Tony
 Wukirasih Sawondari
 Wynne Prakusya
 Yayuk Basuki

Weightlifting 

 Citra Febrianti
 Deni
 Dewi Safitri
 Eko Yuli Irawan
 I Ketut Ariana
 Jadi Setiadi
 Muhammad Hasbi
 Patmawati Abdul Hamid
 Raema Lisa Rumbewas
 Sandow Nasution
 Surahmat Wijoyo
 Sri Indriyani
 Sri Wahyuni Agustiani
 Triyatno
 Winarni Binti Slamet

Wushu 
 Lindswell Kwok

Science & Technology 

 Joe Hin Tjio
 Taufik Akbar
 Jim Geovedi
 Jusuf Habibie
 Soedarsono Hadisapoetro
 Samaun Samadikun
 Pratiwi Sudarmono
 Hary Gunarto

See also  
 
 Indonesian Australians 
 Indonesians in Hong Kong 
 Indonesians in Japan 
 Indonesians in Malaysia 
 Indonesians in the Philippines 
 Indonesians in Saudi Arabia 
 Indonesians in the United Kingdom 
 Indonesian Americans 
 Indonesian Chinese
 List of Javanese
 List of Minangkabaus
 List of Sundanese people

References